The United States Senate Committee on Rules is a defunct Congressional committee, replaced by the United States Senate Committee on Rules and Administration.

History
The Committee was first created as the Select Committee to Revise the Rules of the Senate on December 3, 1867.  On December 9, 1874, it became a standing committee.  On January 2, 1947, it was absorbed into the United States Senate Committee on Rules and Administration along with four other committees.

Chairmen of the Senate Committee on Rules, 1874-1947
Thomas Ferry (R-MI) 1874-1877
James G. Blaine (R-ME) 1877-1879
John T. Morgan (D-AL) 1879-1881
William P. Frye (R-ME) 1881-1887
Nelson W. Aldrich (R-RI) 1887-1893
Joseph C. S. Blackburn (D-KY) 1893-1895
Nelson W. Aldrich (R-RI) 1895-1899
John C. Spooner (R-WI) 1899-1907
Philander C. Knox (R-PA) 1907-1909
W. Murray Crane (R-MA) 1909-1913
Lee S. Overman (D-NC) 1913-1919
Philander C. Knox (R-PA) 1919-1921
Charles Curtis (R-KS) 1921-1929
George H. Moses (R-NH) 1929-1933
Royal S. Copeland (D-NY) 1933-1936
Matthew M. Neely (D-WV) 1936-1941
Harry F. Byrd (D-VA) 1941-1947

Rules
1867 establishments in the United States
1947 disestablishments in the United States